Mechtersen is a municipality in the district of Lüneburg, in Lower Saxony, Germany. It is part of the Samtgemeinde Bardowick ("collective municipality Bardowick").

References